Nthikeng Mohlele is a South African novelist whose novels include Michael K (Picador Africa, 2018), a rewriting of J. M. Coetzee's Life & Times of Michael K. His other novels are: Scent of Bliss (Kwela Books, 2008), Small Things (University of KwaZulu-Natal Press, 2013),  Rusty Bells (University of KwaZulu-Natal Press, 2014), Pleasure (Picador Africa, 2016), and Illumination (Picador Africa, 2019).

Awards
 2017 K Sello Duiker Memorial Literary Award for Pleasure

References

21st-century South African novelists
Living people
Year of birth missing (living people)